A. J. Wickwar was the 15th Surveyor General of Ceylon. He was appointed in 1923, succeeding W. C. S. Ingles, and held the office until 1927. He was succeeded by A. H. G. Dawson.

References

W